Lech Bądkowski (24 January 1920 in Toruń, Poland – 24 February 1984 in Gdańsk) was a Polish writer, journalist, publicist and Kashubian-Pomeranian activist, a promoter of regional history and culture, co-founder and leader of the Kashubian-Pomeranian Association, and opponent of the Communist rules in postwar Poland.

Early life
Lech Bądkowski was born on 24 January 1920 in Toruń, Poland as Leszek, Mieczysław Zygmunt Buntkowski, He attended an elemenrtary school there as well as an all male high school. In 1938 he got admitted to a law faculty at the Józef Piłsudski  University in Warsaw, but after seven days into the academic year he had been drafted into the polish army. During his service, he completed a junior officer course. When the Second World War broke out on 1 September 1939 he participated as a platoon commander in a battle of the Bzura river, which he later described in his book "Soldiers from the Bzura River". In 1940, he managed to escape to France where he joined the newly formed polish army, and in a rank of an Aspirant he fought in Norwegian and French campaigns, where he showed outstanding courage for what he was awarded in 1941, by Gen. Władysław Sikorski, the Silver Cross of the Virtuti Militari War medal, the highest Polish military honor. After the evacuation from France he completed a sabotage and skydiving course in Scotland but had never been dropped off behind enemy lines in the occupied Poland. He was discharged from the army as a second lieutenant. While stationed in England he learned English, continued his general education as well as participated in the activities of the Pomeranian Union which he created. In that time period he completed a booklet "The Pomeranian Political Thought" (1945).

Early career (Stalin Era)
He returned to Poland in 1946 and settled down in Gdynia. His life goal then was to become a politician, but he soon abandoned this idea and took up journalism. He worked in the "Baltic Daily" and wrote numerous articles published in there. In 1947 he married Zofia Janiszewska. In 1953 their daughter Sławina was born. Around this time he changed his name from Buntkowski to "Bądkowski" (Buntkowski was a germanized version of his family name during Poland’s partitions period in 19th and the beginning of the  20th century) and finished commerce and political science studies in Sopot and then also received a diploma for completing a political sciences studies from Lodz University Law Department. He moved to Gdańsk in 1951 and settled on Long Street 79/80 (Długa 79/80). His first book "A Fishing Boat on shore" (Kuter na strądzie) was published in 1952. Since 1953 he was active in the Polish Writers Union but soon was relegated from it by the communist authorities that mistrusted his ideological positions, which could have been influenced by his war experience with the western allies in England. He ended up working in a puppet theater Miniatura in Gdańsk as a literary director and later become a deputy editor of the weekly "The Earth and the Sea".

After the October 1956 thaw
In 1956 Lech Bądkowski co-founded the Kashubian Association (later the Kashubian-Pomeranian Association) and created its ideological manifesto. Since the beginning, he was a member of KPA leadership. He wrote an outline of the history of Kashubian literature (1958), prepared a deep analysis of the organization’ activities from the time of its creation and widen its recognition in the society and later in 1964, changed its name. Between 1957-66 he was also a Chairman of the Gdańsk branch of Polish Writers Union. In that time period, he wrote his most popular books: "It’s joyful in tropics" and "The Battle is going on" (a collection of short stories). He translated the Kashubian novel "The Life and Adventures of Remus" by Aleksander Majkowski into Polish. In 1965 he was awarded a Cross of the Order of Poland's Restitution. He also wrote a lot for the daily "The Voice of the Coast" (Glos Wybrzeża) and for well over a dozen magazines. Some of his texts were broadcast on the Polish Radio Gdańsk. He wrote and published about one book each year and some of them got reprinted. Starting in the mid sixties, his rejection of the communist rule and the censorship grew stronger and stronger, to such a level that in 1968 he openly protested with two other writers from the Pomerania region against communist party brutal clamping down on the student protest demanding more freedoms. The so called “March events” have also caused massive purges of the polish Jews from the various institutions as a manifestation of the infighting between different two factions within the communist party.

The 1970s – Edward Gierek period 
Starting from the early 1970s Lech Bądkowski's creativity slowed down. One of the reasons was the censorship inflicted by communist apparatus and other hardships, another was his lifestyle addiction that led to health problems. That and also a variety of interests and pursuits in that period of his life also lead to losing his focus from writing. In those years Bądkowski managed to edit and prefaced the two books of Augustyn Necel “Z deszczu pod rynnę” (“When it rains it pours”) and “Rewianie” (“The citizens of Rewa”) and the work of the Rev. Juliusz Pobłocki "In the Kashubia 100 years ago". His own literary work at the time was concentrating on the Vistula river Pomerania and its history. In mid-1970s he planned to write a six part cycle of novels on the beginnings of the Pomeranian state, but completed only two volumes: "The Young Prince" (Mlody ksiaze) and "Clouds" (Chmury). For his creative work and the activity promoting Pomerania he was awarded the Stolem Medal (1978). Since 1979 he was a member of the Polish branch of the PEN-Club. He wrote about 1000 articles and over 30 books and pamphlets, some of which got reprinted. He became an object of interest of the Security Service (SB) and his office and the apartment got bugged. He was tagged a code name an "Inspirer" in the Security Service files. Towards the end of the 1970s he joined in the underground activity of the Gdańsk conservative and liberal circles concentrated around the Movement of Young Poland organization (“Ruch Mlodej Polski”)”. In 1978 he published a political essay “Kashubian-Pomeranian paths” (Kaszubsko-Pomorskie drogi) which was previously banned by censor, in an unofficial, underground publishing house,. Towards the end of his life he was able to welcome the birth of his grandson Barnim Bądkowski  born (b. 1979). His grand daughter Miłoslawa was born after his passing.

The 80s 
In August 1980, Lech Bądkowski, as a representative of the area's literary circles joined in the Gdańsk shipyard striking workers, and from 21 August became a member of the Inter Enterprise Strike Committee and later its spokesman and also a member of the group negotiating the Gdańsk Agreements, responsible for formulating the articles related to freedom of speech. He created a discussion club of political thought named after the Constitution of 3 May. In 1980 he began editing an insert called "Self governanace" (Samorządność) to the "Baltic Daily" (Dziennik Bałtycki), a regional newspaper. On 1 August 1981 he was awarded by the President of the city of Gdansk Jerzy Młynarczyk a medal for popularization of the culture, arts and knowledge about Gdańsk. On 17 August Lech Wałesa authorized him to create a weekly “Samorządność” (Self governance) based on the aforementioned insert to the “Baltic Daily”. Only three editions were published starting in November 1981 and then it got suspended during the Martial Law in Poland at the end of that year.

Bądkowski reminded its editor in chief until the end of 1982. During the martial law he published in the “Bratniak” and “Wlasne Zdanie”, underground magazines and worked on preparing the fourth edition of the Samorządność weekly which didn’t get distributed during Solidarity era. In the process of doing it, he gathered around himself many young Solidariry activists. In 1982 he was awarded the Swiętopełk, the Great Golden Seal, for his lifelong activities to benefit the cause of Pomerania region.

Since the end of the 1970s Lech Bądkowski had been ill with cancer and died from it on 24 February 1984 in his apartment on the Long Str. (Długa) in Gdańsk. He was buried at Srebrzysko cemetery in Gdańsk - Wrzeszcz. Five thousand people attended his funeral, amongst them Zbigniew Herbert, Bronisław Geremek, Lech Wałęsa and Donald Tusk, The ceremony did transform into an antigovernment manifestation. Later on, the grave was adorned with a sculpture of the Kashubian Griffin with these words inscribed on it " Lech Bądkowski - writer, soldier, citizen".

Legacy
In 1987 Lech Bądkowski became a patron of the literary award of the Kashubian-Pomeranian association. In 1988 the commemorative plaque was placed on the house located in Fish Market street 6c (Targ Rybny 6c) where his office was located. The inscription on it says: “In this house Lech Bądkowski lived and created between 1960 and 1984. He was a writer, a Kashubian-Pomeranian activist, a signatory of the Gdańsk Shipyard Agreements in 1980”.

From May 1991 Bądkowski became a patron of the elementary school in Luzino. Around this time one of the streets was named after him in the Siedlce neighborhood of Gdańsk and the middle school in Jasień near Gdańsk. In 2000 he received posthumously the honorary title of the Citizen of Gdańsk.

A remembrance gathering took place to celebrate this occasion on 22 February, and on 7 March a special exhibition dedicated to Lech Bądkowski has opened in the gallery Plama entitled: “Lech Bądkowski – a human, writer, citizen”

Several minor streets in Gdańsk, Rumia, Tczew and Starogad Gdański were later named after him as well.

On 3 May 2006 the President Lech Kaczyński awarded Bądkowski posthumously an Order of Poland's Restitution. Since 2006 the monthly "Pomerania" keeps publishing the memories of people who knew Bądkowski. A film "The inspirer" (Inspirator) was made about Bądkowski and was shown in Gdańsk, Gdynia and Luzino and on TV. In the last few years, in addition to many commemorative gatherings, several of his books got republished, 3 books and 3 three master thesis have been written about him. To commemorate the 25th anniversary of his death, the year 2009, was proclaimed the Lech Bądkowski Year. On 18 February the Senate of the Republic of Poland officially commemorated the anniversary of his death. On the same day, the prime minister of Poland at the time, Donald Tusk, and the marshal of the senate Bogdan Borusiewicz opened an exhibition  entitled “Authorities: Lech Bądkowski“ staged by the European Solidarity Center (ESC) which also published a pamphlet containing a comprehensive biographical essay. Also in February, the correspondence between Bądkowski and his long time friend Maciej Słomczyński has been re-published.

Bądkowski is also a patron of a Carrilion in the main City Hall building in Gdańsk.

Bibliography
J. Borzyszkowski, D. Albrecht (red.): Pomorze - mała ojczyzna Kaszubów. Historia i współczesność. Kaschubisch-Pommersche Heimat. Geschichte und Gegenwart, Gdańsk-Lubeka 2000, pp. 454–457 (German/Polish)

1920 births
1984 deaths
People from Toruń
Kashubian translators
Polish journalists
20th-century translators
Polish military personnel of World War II
Recipients of the Silver Cross of the Virtuti Militari
Commanders with Star of the Order of Polonia Restituta
Knights of the Order of Polonia Restituta
20th-century Polish male writers
20th-century Polish journalists